Cẩm Xuyên is a rural district of Hà Tĩnh province in the North Central Coast region of Vietnam. As of 2003 the district had a population of 153,523. The district covers an area of 636 km². The district capital lies at Cẩm Xuyên.

Notable people from the district include Hà Huy Tập (1906 - executed Saigon 1941), third General Secretary of the Central Committee of the Communist Party of Vietnam.

References

Districts of Hà Tĩnh province